Jaro Belfry, also known as Campanario de Jaro, is a historical free-standing bell tower located in front of the Jaro Metropolitan Cathedral in Jaro, Iloilo City, Philippines. It is one of the few belfries in the country that stood apart from the church where it belonged.

History 

Jaro Belfry was built in 1744 and made of bricks and limestone blocks. It served both as a religious structure and as a military watchtower against invaders, including the Moros, during the Spanish colonial period. On July 17, 1787, the belfry was heavily damaged by a strong earthquake. Reconstruction only began in 1833 under the supervision of an Augustinian friar, Fr. Jesse Alvarez. On June 29, 1868, another earthquake damaged this belfry. Msgr. Mariano Cuartero, the first bishop of Jaro, had this completely restored in 1881. On January 25, 1948, the belfry suffered again, in its third major destruction, when the earthquake named Lady Caycay swept through the entire Panay region. The second and third floors of the belfry were collapsed, which left only the first floor as the original structure until these days.

On May 29, 1984, Jaro Belfry was declared a National Historical Landmark by the National Historical Institute (NHI), now known as the National Historical Commission of the Philippines (NHCP). Under the supervision of the agency, the reconstruction of the Jaro Belfry began in the 1990s. It was intended as a viewing deck and tourist center but was never made to work as planned due to a conflict with the Archdiocese of Jaro.

In February 2022, it was again under restoration under the same agency, NHCP. It includes the restoration of its original design with four cardinal virtue statues on the four corners of the structure, which had been missing for years. The turnover ceremony, including the unveiling of its historical marker, took place on November 27, 2022, when it also rang its bells again for the first time in 74 years.

See also 

 Jaro Cathedral

References

External links

Official website
Archdiocese of Jaro on Catholic Bishops Conference of the Philippines online
Archdiocese of Jaro on the Catholic Encyclopedia
Archdiocese of Jaro on Catholic-Hierarchy.org

Spanish Colonial architecture in the Philippines
Buildings and structures in Iloilo City
Tourist attractions in Iloilo City
Baroque architecture in the Philippines